La Escondida is a census-designated place (CDP) in Starr County, Texas, United States. It is a new CDP formed from part of the former Los Villareales CDP prior to the 2010 census with a population of 153.

Geography
La Escondida is located at  (26.380650, -98.873727).

Education
It is in the Rio Grande City Grulla Independent School District (formerly Rio Grande City Consolidated Independent School District)

References

Census-designated places in Starr County, Texas
Census-designated places in Texas